Krzysztof Wołczek (born 17 April 1979) is a Polish retired professional footballer and current manager for Śląsk Wrocław II.

Club career
At the beginning of his career, Wołczek played for his current club Śląsk Wrocław and next Wratislavia Wrocław. Then he moved to Ślęza Wrocław. Next he played for Zagłębie Lubin. In 2000, he moved to Miedź Legnica. In 2001, he played for Chrobry Głogów and again Zagłębie Lubin. Then he moved to Świt Nowy Dwór Mazowiecki. He return to Zagłębie Lubin in 2002. In 2003, he played for Pogoń Staszow. In 2004, he moved to his native club Śląsk Wrocław,. He ended his football career in 2017 in Polonia Trzebnica.

Managerial career
On 22 March 2021, he was announced the assistant coach of Jacek Magiera in Śląsk Wrocław. On 19 June 2021, he became the manager of their second-league reserves. On 9 March 2022, he joined Piotr Tworek's staff as an assistant of the senior team. Following Tworek's dismissal at the end of the season, Wołczek returned to his previous post on 17 June 2022.

References

External links
 

1979 births
Living people
Sportspeople from Wrocław
Polish footballers
Ekstraklasa players
I liga players
Śląsk Wrocław players
Zagłębie Lubin players
Miedź Legnica players
Chrobry Głogów players
Świt Nowy Dwór Mazowiecki players
Pogoń Staszów players
Aluminium Konin players
Association football defenders
Polish football managers
II liga managers